Oliver "Oli" Oakes is a British former racing driver, entrepreneur and team principal and director of Hitech GP. He was the 2005 World Karting champion, and was once a part of the Red Bull Junior Team.

Oakes moved into team management when he set up his first karting team in 2011 before launching junior single-seater racing team Hitech GP in 2015.

Biography

Early life

Oakes was born 11 January 1988, the son of Billy Oakes, the founder and owner of the former Formula Renault and British F3 team Eurotek Motorsport. He was educated at The King's School, Ely. He began karting at age 4.

Racing career
Beginning his racing career in karting, Oakes was twice British Open Champion at the age of 12. His karting career ended after winning the Karting World Championship in 2005 at 17 years of age. His performances saw him attract the attention of the Red Bull Young Driver Programme, alongside Formula 1 graduates Sebastian Vettel, Brendon Hartley, Jaime Alguersuari and Sébastien Buemi.

Moving to car racing in 2006, Oakes debuted in Formula BMW with Carlin Motorsport, where he took pole and the victory in his first race. Further claiming 3 podiums and a string of strong results, he finished the season in 6th overall in the Formula BMW UK Championship. He was nominated for the McLaren Autosport BRDC Award.

In 2007, Oakes joined Motopark for the 2007 Formula Renault Eurocup season in which he finished 12th.

Oakes joined Eurotek Motorsport to compete in the British Formula 3 Championship in 2008, taking pole position at the final round at Donington.

He moved to Carlin Motorsport for his 2009 campaign, but left after two rounds. Oakes took up test-driver roles for the rest of 2009 an raced in the GP3 Series in 2010 for Atech CRS, finishing 28th in the championship.

Post-racing career 
Since 2010 Oakes has been involved in various team roles whilst maintaining an ongoing affiliation with Tony Kart.

Team Oakes Racing 
Team Oakes is a karting team and management service founded in 2011. Former drivers include Callum Ilott, Marcus Armstrong, Nikita Mazepin and Clement Novalak. Team Oakes have competed in WSK Championship Events, the German DKM Series and the CIK-FIA World and European Championships.

Hitech GP 

Hitech GP was formed in early 2015 with David Hayle who previously formed Hitech Racing in 2003. Hitech currently competes in the FIA Formula 2, FIA Formula 3 and F3 Asian Championship Certified by FIA as well as managing the racing operations of W Series and the FIA Motorsport Games.

Racing record

Career summary 

† Oakes was a guest driver and ineligible for points.
* Oakes was a invited driver in rounds 9–11 and thus was only eligible for points in rounds 2 and 8.

Complete GP3 Series results 
(key) (Races in bold indicate pole position) (Races in italics indicate fastest lap)

References 

1988 births
Living people
People from Attleborough
English racing drivers
British Formula Three Championship drivers
Formula 3 Euro Series drivers
GP3 Series drivers
International Formula Master drivers
Formula BMW ADAC drivers
Formula BMW UK drivers
British Formula Renault 2.0 drivers
Formula Renault 2.0 NEC drivers
Formula Renault Eurocup drivers
Karting World Championship drivers
People educated at King's Ely
Carlin racing drivers
Eurotek Motorsport drivers
CRS Racing drivers
Euronova Racing drivers
Mücke Motorsport drivers
Motopark Academy drivers
Cram Competition drivers